Brian Benedict (born December 27, 1968) is a former U.S. soccer forward.  Benedict was a significant player with the U.S. national youth teams and earned four caps with the U.S. national team in 1991 and 1992.

College
Benedict, a product of the Coral Springs, Florida soccer community, attended Duke University where he played on the men's soccer team from 1986 to 1989.  The Blue Devils won the NCAA Men's Soccer Championship in 1986, his freshman season.  In 1988, he was named a first team All American.

National team

Youth teams
Benedict was a member of the U.S. national youth teams at the 1985 FIFA U-16 World Championship.  The U.S. went 1-0-2 in group play and did not qualify for the second round.  Two years later, he was part of the U.S. team at the 1987 FIFA World Youth Championship.  Once again, the U.S. went 1-0-2 in group play and did not make the second round.

Senior team
Benedict earned his first of four caps in a 1–0 loss to Jamaica on September 14, 1991.  He came on for Chris Henderson in the 46th minute.  His next three caps all came in February 1992, his last in a 2–0 loss to El Salvador on February 18, 1992.

References

1968 births
Living people
All-American men's college soccer players
American soccer players
United States men's international soccer players
Duke Blue Devils men's soccer players
Sportspeople from Coral Springs, Florida
Soccer players from Florida
United States men's youth international soccer players
United States men's under-20 international soccer players
Association football forwards